Moores is a Canadian chain of clothing stores.

Moores may also refer to:

Places
 Moores, former name of Riverton, California
 Moores Flat, California, a former settlement
 Moores Hill, Indiana
 Moores Branch, a stream in Kansas and Missouri

People with the surname Moores
 Aaron Moores (born 1994), British swimmer
 Alec Moores (1919–2014), Canadian politician
 Billy Moores (born 1948), Canadian ice hockey executive
 Charles B. Moores (1849–1930), American businessman and Oregon politician
 Clara Moores (1896–1986), American stage actress
 Dick Moores (1909–1986), American comic strip creator whose best known work was for the comic strip Gasoline Alley
 Eldridge Moores (1938–2018), American geologist
 Frank Moores (1933–2005), Canadian politician and businessman
 Gary Moores (born 1959), British wrestler
 Ian Moores (1954–1998), English footballer
 Indira Moores, Canadian wrestler
 Isaac R. Moores (1796–1861), American soldier and politician in Illinois and Oregon
 Isaac R. Moores Jr. (1831–1884), American businessman and Oregon politician
 James Moores, American politician
 Jeff Moores (–1989), Australian rugby player
 John Moores (baseball) (born 1944), American businessman
 John Moores (British businessman) (1896–1993), British businessman, football club owner, politician and philanthropist
 John Moores Jr. (1928–2012), British businessman
 John H. Moores (1821–1880), American businessman and Oregon politician
 Mark Moores (born 1970), New Mexico state legislature and former Republican candidate in 2021 New Mexico's 1st congressional district special election
 Merrill Moores (1856–1929), Indiana lawyer and politician
 Peter Moores (businessman) (1932–2016), British businessman, art collector and philanthropist
 Peter Moores (cricketer) (born 1962), English cricketer and coach
 Simon Moores, British businessman
 Ted Moores (born 1943), Canadian boat builder
 Tom Moores (born 1996), English cricketer
 Tom Moores (politician) (1903–1983), Australian politician
 Yvonne Moores (born 1941), British nurse

See also
 Moore (disambiguation)